Nipple shield may refer to:
 Nipple shield (breastfeeding), a temporary protective sheath worn during breastfeeding
 Nipple shield (jewelry), a type of body jewelry

See also
Breast shells, which protect nipples from being flattened in preparation for breastfeeding
Pasties, a nipple covering for fashion purposes